Hurricane Juliette was the strongest hurricane and final tropical cyclone of the inactive 1995 Pacific hurricane season. The tenth named storm of the season, Juliette formed on September 16 from a tropical wave off the southwest coast of Mexico. For the majority of its track, the storm moved toward the west-northwest, and Juliette quickly intensified to major hurricane status. Later it turned toward the northeast, briefly threatening the Baja California Peninsula, although the hurricane never affected land.

Meteorological history

A tropical wave moved off the coast of Africa behind Hurricane Luis on August 31. Strong outflow from Luis prevented development of the wave, and it continued westward until crossing into the eastern Pacific Ocean on September 12. Convection increased as it moved through the Gulf of Tehuantepec, and the cloud pattern organized sufficiently to warrant Dvorak classifications for the system on September 15. Due to the tropical depression moving over an area of warm water temperatures with favorable upper level outflow, the National Hurricane Center forecast the tropical depression to slowly intensify to  winds within 72 hours the forecast early on September 16.

The tropical depression was small in size, and moving to the west-northwest, intensified into a tropical storm on September 17. Juliette quickly organized with a well-defined band of convection drawn into the circulation. The storm quickly intensified, and subsequent to the development of a small eye Juliette attained hurricane status on September 18, just 42 hours after developing. The eye became better defined as the hurricane moved to the west-northwest, a motion caused by a weak ridge to its north, and Juliette attained major hurricane status early on September 19. Possibly due to increased northeasterly wind shear from an upper-level trough, Juliette stopped its intensification trend, though as it turned to the west it again re-organized.

After maintaining its peak intensity for less than 12 hours, Juliette began to weaken due to an eyewall replacement cycle. An eastward moving trough of low pressure turned the hurricane to the north-northeast into an area of cooler water temperatures and increased wind shear. Juliette quickly weakened to a tropical storm late on September 24. The eastward moving trough moved past the storm, resulting in the motion of Juliette turning to a southeast drift.

Preparations and impact
When the motion of Juliette turned to the northeast, some computer models predicted it to continue northeastward and strike Baja California Sur. As a result, the government of Mexico issued a tropical storm watch as a precautionary measure for portions of the state. When the storm weakened rapidly and turned from the coast, the watch was canceled. Juliette remained away from land masses for its lifetime, and as a result there were no reports of damage or deaths. In southern California, however, the hurricane produced high waves that created dangerous surfing conditions. These waves wiped out a fishing derby. The remnants of Hurricane Juliette moved into New Mexico and western Texas, producing scattered showers and thunderstorms.

See also

Other storms of the same name
1995 Pacific hurricane season
List of Category 4 Pacific hurricanes

References

1995 Pacific hurricane season
Category 4 Pacific hurricanes